Christopher Boyle (born 11 August 1972 in Glasgow, Scotland) is a Fellow of the British Psychological Society, Senior Fellow of the Higher Education Academy and professor of inclusion and educational psychology at the University of Adelaide. He has previously been an association football referee who refereed in the Australian A-League and the Scottish Premier League. Boyle is a qualified psychologist working in the UK and in Australia. He has written extensively on subjects in psychology and inclusive education. He is a respected academic and has authored over 100 publications on these topics.

He edited the Australian Psychological Society's journal The Australian Educational and Developmental Psychologist   between 2012 and 2017.

Early life and education

Refereeing career
Boyle has officiated matches in the Scottish Premier League and Scottish Football League, making him one of the most experienced referees in the A-League. He made headlines in his debut match of his A-League career when he officiated the game between Melbourne Victory and North Queensland Fury at AAMI Park. During the game, he awarded three penalties (two to Melbourne, one to North Queensland), and handed out two red cards to North Queensland players Chris Grossman and Eric Akoto.

Academic career
He has a wide and varied career and has lectured on  professional training programmes for educational psychologists at the University of Dundee, Monash University, and at the University of Exeter. He has also lectured in subject areas of child development and psychology, inclusive and special education with the Open University, Charles Sturt University, and the University of New England, Australia. He completed his PhD in psychology and education at the University of Dundee.

Media coverage
Boyle's academic work regularly receives media attention, and he is often asked to contribute to articles and TV and radio programmes around the world.

Published books
Inclusive Education: Global Issues and Controversies  (with Joanna Anderson, Angela Page and Sofia Mavropoulou)
Pathways to Belonging: Contemporary Research in School Belonging  (with Kelly Allen) 
Equality in education: Fairness and inclusion  (with Hongzhi Zhang and Philip Wing Keung Chan)
Boyle, C., & Gamble, N. (2014). Ethical practice in applied psychology. Melbourne: Oxford University Press.
Boyle, C.  (Ed.) (2013). Student Learning: Improving Practice. New York: Nova Publishers.
Boyle, C., & Topping, K. (Eds.) (2012). What works in inclusion? London: Open University Press.

References

External links
 Ultimate A-League profile
 ResearchGate 
 Orcid 

1972 births
Living people
A-League Men referees
Scottish football referees
Academic staff of the University of Adelaide
Educational psychologists
British Psychological Society
Alumni of the University of Strathclyde
Alumni of the University of Glasgow
Alumni of the University of Dundee
Academic journal editors
Fellows of the British Psychological Society
Scottish Football League referees
Scottish Premier League referees